Brightgate is a village in Derbyshire, England. The population is recorded in the civil parish of Bonsall, Derbyshire.

References

Villages in Derbyshire
Derbyshire Dales